The A 1 road (commonly known as the Colombo - Kandy Road or just the Kandy Road) is an A-Grade trunk road in Sri Lanka. It connects the capital city of Colombo with Kandy.

History 
Commonly known as the Kandy Road, the A 1 was the first modern highway in the island.  Construction began in 1820 under the orders of the British Governor of Ceylon, Sir Robert Wilmot-Horton, 3rd Baronet.  Construction was carried out by Captain William Francis Dawson—who died during the project—along with Major Thomas Skinner. In the memory of Captain Dawson, the Dawson Tower was erected at Kadugannawa in the Kadugannawa Pass.

Route 
The A1 highway begins at Colombo Fort.  It passes through Peliyagoda, Kelaniya, Kiribathgoda, Mahara, Kadawatha, Kirillawala, Imbulgoda, Balummahara, Miriswaththa, Yakkala, Weediyawaththa, Thihariya, Nittambuwa, Pasyala, Wewaldeniya, Danovita, Warakapola, and Ambepussa.  At Ambepussa, Kurunegala, Mawathagama, Weuda the A6 Highway branches off the A1, heading towards Kurunegala.  The A1 continues east, passing Tholangamuwa, Udukumbura, Nelundeniya, Yattogoda, Galigamuwa, Ambanpitiya, Ranwala, Kegalle, Meepitiya, Karandupana, Molagoda, Uthuwankanda, Anwarama, Mawanella, Beligammana, Hingula, Kadugannawa, Pilimathalawa, Kiribathkumbura, and Peradeniya to reach Kandy.

Images
Here are some photos of A1 Highway and notable places found along it.

References

A01 highway